The 2014–15 UCLA Bruins men's basketball team represented the University of California, Los Angeles during the 2014–15 NCAA Division I men's basketball season.  The Bruins were led by second-year head coach Steve Alford and played their home games at Pauley Pavilion as members in the Pac-12 Conference.  The team featured two All-Pac-12 performers in Norman Powell and Kevon Looney. Although the freshman Looney was seen as a potential NBA lottery pick, the senior Powell became the Bruins' most consistent performer. After numerous non-conference losses to start the season, UCLA finished in fourth place (11–7) in the Pac-12. They earned a No. 11 seed in the NCAA tournament, and advanced to the Sweet 16, becoming the lowest-seed UCLA team to ever reach the regional semifinals. The program produced its 49th 20-win season.

The Bruins began the season 4–0 and ranked No. 22 before losing two of three games at the Battle 4 Atlantis tournament. According to some pundits, the Bruins had the toughest non-conference schedule in the Pac-12. However, it did not net any signature wins, losing to ranked North Carolina, Gonzaga, and Kentucky. Beginning with their December loss at home to Gonzaga, the Bruins lost five consecutive games, their longest streak since 2009–10. Losses included a 39-point defeat to No. 1 Kentucky—they fell behind 24–0 and trailed 41–7 at halftime—and by 32 points against Utah. After Gonzaga, UCLA went 25 days without a home game, the longest in the school's history since 1972–73. They recovered to win eight of their next 11. After getting swept in a road trip to Arizona, UCLA closed out the regular season with three straight home wins to finish undefeated (9–0) at home in the conference for the first time since 2006–07. However, UCLA had few wins against notable teams during the season, and experts widely predicted that they needed a strong performance in the Pac-12 tournament to qualify for the NCAA tournament. The Bruins went 1–1, and were eliminated by Arizona. Although they were 0–2 for the season against the Wildcats, both games were competitive until the end.

Proving most major projections wrong, UCLA received an invite to the NCAA tournament, earning a No. 11 seed. Selection committee chairman Scott Barnes cited the Bruins' strength of schedule and improved play, even in their tournament loss to Arizona, as factors in their inclusion. In the Bruins' opener, Bryce Alford was credited with the game-winning three-point field goal after a goaltending call with 13 seconds remaining in a 60–59 win over sixth-seeded SMU. He finished with a game-high 27 points and made 9 of 11 three-point attempts. They advanced to the Sweet 16, where they lost again to Gonzaga, 74–62.

Previous season

The UCLA Bruins finished the season with a record of 28–9 after advancing to the 2014 NCAA Division I men's basketball tournament. At the Pac-12 Conference tournament, the Bruins defeated the Arizona Wildcats 75–71 for the tournament championship. Kyle Anderson was voted the tournament's Most Outstanding Player after scoring 21 points and grabbing 15 rebounds in the championship game. The Bruins advanced to the Sweet 16 of the 2014 NCAA tournament—their first regional semifinal appearance since 2008—before falling to Florida, who improved to 4–0 all-time against UCLA in the NCAA tournament.

Offseason

Departures

2014 recruiting class

Roster

Schedule

|-
!colspan=12 style="background:#; color:#;"| Exhibition

|-
!colspan=12 style="background:#; color:#;"| Non-conference regular season

|-
!colspan=12 style="background:#;"| Pac-12 regular season

|-
!colspan=12 style="background:#;"| Pac-12 Tournament

|-
!colspan=12 style="background:#;"| NCAA tournament

Rankings

Awards and honors

Pac-12 Conference Player of the Week
 November 24, 2014 – Norman Powell
 January 12, 2015 – Kevon Looney
 February 2, 2015 – Norman Powell
 March 2, 2015 – Norman Powell
All-Pac-12 Teams
 Norman Powell – First-team All-Pac-12, honorable mention All-Defensive  Team
 Kevon Looney – Second-team All-Pac-12, Pac-12 All-Freshman Team 
 Bryce Alford – Honorable mention All-Pac-12
USBWA All-District IX Team 
Norman Powell
NABC All-District 20 Team
Norman Powell – Second-team 
Kevon Looney – Second-team
UCLA Team Awards
 Norman Powell – the Coach John R. Wooden Award as the team's Most Valuable Player
Kevon Looney – the Gerald A. Finerman Award as the team's rebounding leader and the Seymour Armond Memorial Award as the most valuable freshman
 Bryce Alford – the UCLA Alumni Association Award as the team's leader in assists (4.9 apg)

Notes
 January 14, 2015 – Norman Powell becomes the first since Toby Bailey to win four games in a row at USC.
 January 15, 2015 – Pac-12 Conference announced that Dave Meyers will be inducted into the Pac-12 Conference Men's Basketball Hall of Honor at the 2015 Pac-12 Basketball tournament.
 January 31, 2015 – 1964 and 1965 NCAA Championship teams were honored at halftime during the Colorado game.
 February 14, 2015 – The 1995 NCAA Championship team was honored at halftime. Former head coach Jim Harrick, players Ed O'Bannon, Charles O'Bannon, Toby Bailey, Tyus Edney and Kris Johnson attended the game.
 March 1, 2015 – The 1975 National Championship team celebrated its 40th anniversary at halftime .
 March 4, 2015 – Play-by-play announcer Chris Roberts broadcast his final game at Pauley Pavilion, retiring after 23 seasons; Four seniors—Powell, Kory Alford, David Brown, and Nick Kazemi—were honored before the game on Senior Day.
 March 10, 2015 – UCLA announced the construction of the Mo Ostin Basketball Center.
 April 6, 2015 – Kevon Looney foregoes his remaining collegiate eligibility and enters the 2015 NBA Draft.

References

External links

2014–15 Season notes and stats

UCLA
UCLA Bruins men's basketball seasons
UCLA
UCLA
UCLA